Gascoyne coast can mean:-
 The Western Australian fishery bioregion
 The Western Australian tourist promotion region
 The Bureau of Meteorology coastal forecast region